Eileen Robinson (born 1951), is a retired archer who competed for Great Britain and England.

Archery career
Robinson represented Great Britain in the 1984 Summer Olympics. She represented England in the women's individual event, at the 1982 Commonwealth Games in Brisbane, Queensland, Australia.

References

1951 births
English female archers
Archers at the 1982 Commonwealth Games
Archers at the 1984 Summer Olympics
Olympic archers of Great Britain
Sportspeople from Manchester
Living people
Commonwealth Games competitors for England